The Endicott River is a stream,  long, in Haines Borough in the U.S. state of Alaska. Beginning at the base of an unnamed glacier near Mount Young in the Chilkat Range, it flows generally eastward into the Lynn Canal. Most of the river's course lies within the Endicott River Wilderness of the Tongass National Forest.

See also
List of rivers of Alaska

References

Rivers of Haines Borough, Alaska
Rivers of Alaska